The name Krovanh has been used to name four tropical cyclones in the northwestern Pacific Ocean. The name was contributed by Cambodia, and means Cardamom (ក្រវាញ) in Khmer.

Typhoon Krovanh (2003) (T0312, 12W, Niña), struck the Philippines and China
Severe Tropical Storm Krovanh (2009) (T0911, 12W)
Typhoon Krovanh (2015) (T1520, 20W)
Tropical Storm Krovanh (2020) (T2023, 26W, Vicky)

Pacific typhoon set index articles